David or Dave Dahl may refer to:

David P. Dahl (born 1937), American organist and co-founder of Olympic Organ Builders
Dave Dahl (entrepreneur) (born 1963), American baker, creator of Dave's Killer Bread
David Dahl (baseball) (born 1994), American baseball player
Dave Dahl (meteorologist), American meteorologist
Dave Dahl, American researcher and technologist, co-founder of Web Associates (later called LEVEL Studios), Placemark One and Cryptografx

See also
Dahl (disambiguation)